These are the matches that Udinese have played in European football competitions. The club's first entry into European competitions was in the 1997–98 UEFA Cup, with their only trophy coming in the 2000 UEFA Intertoto Cup.

UEFA-organised seasonal competitions 
Udinese's score listed first.

UEFA Champions League

UEFA Cup and Europa League

UEFA Intertoto Cup

Overall record

UEFA Competitions record
Accurate as of 27 August 2017

Source: UEFA.comPld = Matches played; W = Matches won; D = Matches drawn; L = Matches lost; GF = Goals for; GA = Goals against; GD = Goal Difference.

References

Udinese Calcio
Italian football clubs in international competitions